The genus Massilia belongs to the family Oxalobacteriaceae, and describes a group of gram-negative, motile, rod-shaped cells. They may contain either peritrichous or polar flagella. This genus was first described in 1998, after the type species, Massilia timonae, was isolated from the blood of an immunocompromised patient. The genus was named after the old Greek and Roman name for the city of Marseille, France, where the organism was first isolated. The Massilia genus is a diverse group that resides in many different environments, has many heterotrophic means of gathering energy, and is commonly found in association with plants.

Culture of Massilia 
Isolation of Massilia sp. commonly occurs on Reasoner's 2A (R2A) agar. Colonies are often shades of white, yellow, or orange, but may be blue-purple if producing the compound violacein. As of 2022, 16S rRNA-based phylogenetic trees place the Massilia genus within a polyphyletic group of the Oxalobacteriaceae, alongside other genera including Duganella, Pseudoduganella, Janthinobacterium, and Rugamonas.

Habitats 
Massilia sp. are environmental organisms that are commonly associated with plants. They have been isolated from the soil, flowers, seeds, and roots of many species of plants. They are generally psychrophilic or mesophilic, preferring cool to moderate temperatures, and they are generally either strict aerobes or microaerophiles. Massilia are proficient at surface colonization, including the seed coat, emerging radicles, roots, and even the hyphae of Pythium.

Massilia have been isolated from other, sometimes extreme, environments as well, including the Sahara Desert, freshwater, glaciers, rocks, and air samples. Manganese-oxidizing Massilia have been isolated. In rare cases, some Massilia sp. have caused infections in humans. However, doctors presume that these infections were likely opportunistic, as Massilia sp. are generally considered environmental organisms, rather than animal-associated.

Metabolism

Complex polymer degradation 
Some Massilia sp. are able to degrade cellulose or chitin, two naturally occurring carbohydrate polymers, using cellulase and endochitinase enzymes, respectively. Many Massilia produce extracellular proteases, which can degrade proteins, producing carbon and nitrogen for the organism to consume, Massilia have also been reported to hydrolyse gelatin, casein, starch, DNA, tyrosine, and more. Massilia may play a crucial role in carbon cycling due to their broad range of degradative enzymes,

Massilia also have the potential to degrade many pollutants present in the environment. Massilia sp. WF1 was able to degrade the polycyclic aromatic hydrocarbon phenanthrene, each when alone and when in co-culture with the fungal species Phanerochaete chrysosporium.

Plant-growth-promoting traits 
Some Massilia sp. are capable of phosphorus solubilization in the soil. Phosphorus solubilization allows plants to take in more phosphorus, potentially promoting plant growth. Analysis of Massilia genomes has identified genes for producing auxins, plant hormones, which can promote or alter plant growth. Their hydrolysis of extracellular compounds, such as proteins or DNA, can also release nutrients for the plant or other bacteria to utilize.

Antibiotic production is found in a few Massilia isolates, though many of these antibiotic compounds have not been identified. Massilia rhizosphaerae has antibacterial activity against the plant pathogen Ralstonia solanacearum.Massilia antibiotica has antibacterial activity against the pathogens Escherichia coli and Pseudomonas aeruginosa.

Quorum-regulated traits 
Some Massilia sp. are known to produce violacein, a pigment also prouduced by Chromobacterium violaceum. This produces blue-purple pigmented colonies. Violacein production is regulated by quorum-sensing. a mechanism by which bacteria alter their gene expression in response to the population density.

References

Burkholderiales
Bacteria genera